The third season of La Más Draga premiered on 22 September and concluded on 1 December 2020. The competition was broadcast on YouTube, and was produced by La Gran Diabla Producciones. The series featured thirtheen contestants, from all over Mexico, competing for the title of La Más Draga of Mexico and Latin America and a cash prize of $150,000 MXN Pesos. The winner of the third season of La Más Draga was Aviesc Who?, with Madison, Raga Diamante and Rudy Reyes as runners-up.

The judges panel of this season include Mexican singer and actress Karla Díaz, who was also the main host, TV and Internet personality Johnny Carmona, hair and makeup artist Yari Mejía, and drag performer Bernardo "Letal" Vázquez.

The season consisted of eleven one-hour episodes.

Unlike previous seasons, the castings were followed by Live Auditions held in Monterrey, Guadalajara, Mexico City and Ciudad Juárez, from which the first eight contestants were selected. The final five contestants, also known as "Secret Contestants", were invited to participate directly by the show's production.

Contestants 
Ages, names, and cities stated are at time of filming.

Notes

Contestant progress 
Legend:

Scores history

Lip syncs 
Legend:

Judges

Main judges 
 Bernardo "Letal" Vázquez, drag queen and professional makeup artist
 Johnny Carmona, TV and Internet personality
 Yari Mejía, designer, stylist, singer and model

Guest judges 
Listed in chronological order.

 Regina Orozco, actress and singer
 Ana Bárbara, singer, actress, model and TV personality
 Alejandra Bogue, actress, comedian and TV host
 Apio Quijano, singer
 Maribel Guardia, actress, model and TV personality
 Bárbara de Regil, actress
 Aldo Rendón, stylist
 Albertano, actor and comedian
 Carmen Salinas, actress, impressionist, comedian and politician
 Andrea & Miguel, winners of La Más Draga online contest

Special guests
Guests who will appear in episodes, but not judge on the main stage.

Episode 1
 Gabilú Mireles, Foreo's representative

Episode 3
 Jorge Boyoli , TV host and choreographer
 Thalía, singer and actress

Episode 4
Mario Bustamente, Impulse CDMX's representative

Episode 5
 Ricky Lips, drag performer and celebrity impersonator

Episode 6
 Anahí, actress and singer
 Quecho Muñoz, actor, singer, and writer

Episode 7
 Alex Córdova, photographer
 Maribel Rubio, psychologist and Internet personality

Episode 9
 Neiko, DJ, singer and vocal coach

Episode 11
 Alexis 3XL, winner of season 2
 Eva Blunt, runner-up on season 1
 Gvajardo, runner-up on season 2
 Margaret Y Ya, runner-up on season 1
 Neiko, DJ, singer and vocal coach
 Paco Del Mazo, YouTuber and Internet personality
 UnTalFredp, content creator and entrepreneur

Episodes
<onlyinclude>

References 

Mexican reality television series
Mexican LGBT-related television shows
Drag (clothing) television shows
Reality competition television series
2020s LGBT-related reality television series
2020 in LGBT history